Rayna Kasabova (Cyrillic: Райна Касабова; 1 May 1897, in Karlovo – 25 May 1969) was a volunteer nurse and the first woman in the world who participated in a military flight during the First Balkan War in 1912. On 30 October 1912, at the age of 15, Kasabova was an observer in a Voisin aircraft that flew over enemy positions in Edirne. Kasabova threw out Turkish language propaganda leaflets.

Kasabova Glacier on Davis Coast in Graham Land on the Antarctic Peninsula, Antarctica is named after Rayna Kasabova. There is a service road named Rayna Kasabova in Bulgaria adjacent to the Sofia Airport.

References

Further reading

1897 births
1969 deaths
People from Karlovo
Bulgarian military personnel of the Balkan Wars
20th-century Bulgarian military personnel
Bulgarian Air Force personnel
Bulgarian women aviators
Women in European warfare
Women in war 1900–1945